Gilles Magnus (born 30 August 1999) is a Belgian racing driver currently competing in the World Touring Car Cup. He is also a factory driver for Audi Sport.

Career

Karting
Magnus began karting at the age of eight, claiming numerous titles in his career.

Lower formulae
In 2016, Magnus progressed to single-seaters in the French F4 Championship. There he claimed a victory, a fastest lap and accumulated numerous podiums to finish vice-champion to Ye Yifei.

Formula Renault
In October 2016, Magnus partook in the rookie test at Estoril. In February 2017, he was signed by R-ace GP for the NEC Championship.

FIA Motorsport Games
Magnus won the silver medal at the 2019 FIA Motorsport Games Touring Car Cup representing Team Belgium.

Racing record

Career Summary

† As Magnus was a guest driver, he was ineligible to score points.
* Season still in progress.

Complete French F4 Championship results 
(key) (Races in bold indicate pole position) (Races in italics indicate fastest lap)

Complete TCR Europe Touring Car Series results
(key) (Races in bold indicate pole position) (Races in italics indicate fastest lap)

† Driver did not finish the race, but was classified as he completed over 90% of the race distance.

Complete World Touring Car Cup results
(key) (Races in bold indicate pole position) (Races in italics indicate fastest lap)

Complete GT World Challenge Europe Sprint Cup results
(key) (Races in bold indicate pole position) (Races in italics indicate fastest lap)

References

External links
 

1999 births
Living people
Belgian racing drivers
French F4 Championship drivers
Formula Renault 2.0 NEC drivers
World Touring Car Cup drivers
FIA Motorsport Games drivers
Formula Renault Eurocup drivers
Blancpain Endurance Series drivers
R-ace GP drivers
Audi Sport drivers
W Racing Team drivers
21st-century Belgian people
Saintéloc Racing drivers
Comtoyou Racing drivers
24H Series drivers
Le Mans Cup drivers
GT4 European Series drivers
TCR Europe Touring Car Series drivers